The men's 1 metre springboard diving event at the 2019 Summer Universiade was contested between 2 and 4 July 2019 at the Mostra d'Oltremare in Naples, Italy.

Schedule
All times are Central European Summer Time (UTC+02:00)

Results

Preliminary

Semifinals

Group A

Group B

Final

References 

Diving at the 2019 Summer Universiade